The 2007–08 Scottish Junior Cup was a competition in Scottish Junior football. It was won for the first time by Bathgate Thistle after they defeated Cumnock Juniors 2–1 in the final at Rugby Park, Kilmarnock.

Under a recent rule change, the Junior Cup winners (along with winners of the North, East and West regional leagues) qualify for the senior Scottish Cup; Bathgate Thistle therefore competed in the 2008–09 Scottish Cup.

First round
These ties were scheduled to take place on Saturday 6 October 2007.

Second round
These ties were scheduled to take place on Saturday 3 November 2007.

Third round
These ties were scheduled to take place on 1 December 2007.

Fourth round
These ties were scheduled to take place on 19 January 2008.

Fifth round
These ties were scheduled to take place on 16 February 2008.

Quarter finals
These ties were scheduled to take place on 15 March 2008.

Semi finals
These ties were played on 12 April and 19 April 2008, respectively, at Broadwood Stadium, Cumbernauld.

Final
The final took place on 1 June 2008, at Rugby Park, Kilmarnock.

References

Scottish Junior Cup seasons
Junior Cup